Coulter Run is a  long 1st order tributary to Middle Wheeling Creek in Ohio County, West Virginia.  This is the only stream of this name in the United States.

Course 
Coulter Run rises about 1.5 miles southeast of Valley Grove, West Virginia and then flows south-southeast to join Middle Wheeling Creek about 2 miles northeast of Camp Giscowhego.

Watershed 
Coulter Run drains  of area, receives about 41.0 in/year of precipitation, has a wetness index of 301.74, and is about 37% forested.

See also 
 List of rivers of West Virginia

References 

Rivers of Ohio County, West Virginia
Rivers of West Virginia